
Gmina Chrzanów is a rural gmina (administrative district) in Janów Lubelski County, Lublin Voivodeship, in eastern Poland.

Villages
Gmina Chrzanów contains the villages and settlements of Chrzanów, Chrzanów-Kolonia, Łada, Malinie and Otrocz.

Neighbouring gminas
Gmina Chrzanów is bordered by the gminas of Dzwola, Godziszów, Goraj, Turobin and Zakrzew.

References

Polish official population figures 2006

Chrzanow
Janów Lubelski County